Eduard Laaman (12 February 1888 Beregovoye village (now Bakhchysarai Raion), Simferopolsky Uyezd, Taurida Governorate – 1 September 1941 Kirov Oblast) was an Estonian historian, journalist and politician. He was a member of Estonian National Assembly.

References

1888 births
1941 deaths
People from Bakhchysarai Raion
People from Simferopolsky Uyezd
Estonian Radical Socialist Party politicians
Estonian Labour Party politicians
Members of the Estonian National Assembly
Estonian journalists
Estonian people executed by the Soviet Union